Horace Bernard Walls III (born December 30, 2001), known professionally as Nardo Wick, is an American rapper. Signed to Flawless Entertainment and RCA Records, he is best known for his 2021 single "Who Want Smoke?", which has a remix featuring fellow rappers G Herbo, Lil Durk, and 21 Savage that propelled it to debut at number 17 on the US  Billboard Hot 100 and earn platinum certification by the RIAA. Wick released his debut studio album, Who Is Nardo Wick?, that same year.

Career
Wick released his debut single, "Lolli". He then released the single "Slide". He then released the single "Came Up" as the final release of the year. Starting off 2021, he released the single "Who Want Smoke?" on January 22, 2021. Wick then released the single "Shhh" on April 23, 2021. It serves as the lead single to his debut studio album, Who Is Nardo Wick?. On August 27, 2021
, Wick was featured on fellow American rapper 42 Dugg's song, "Opp Pack", from the deluxe edition of the latter's commercial mixtape Free Dem Boyz. The song served as Wick's first time being featured on a song by another artist. On October 8, 2021, Wick released another version of "Who Want Smoke?", which features fellow rappers G Herbo, Lil Durk, and 21 Savage. The song serves as the second single to Who Is Nardo Wick? and was released alongside an accompanying music video that was directed by Cole Bennett in association with Lyrical Lemonade. The new version boosted the popularity of the song alongside a dance to it that was created on video-sharing app TikTok, which debuted at number 17 on the Billboard Hot 100 and was certified platinum by the RIAA, which gave Wick both his first charting song and his first song that received a certification, respectively. Two days later, Wick was featured on rapper Katana 10400's single, "She Want Me Dead!", which served as Wick's second feature and first time being featured on a single. Wick released the single "Me or Sum", which features fellow rappers Future and Lil Baby, on November 29, 2021. It serve as the second single of Who Is Nardo Wick? The album was released four days later, on December 3, 2021. It features new guest appearances from Hit-Boy, Big30, and Lakeyah. On July 22, 2022,  Wick released the deluxe version Who Is Nardo Wick? 2 with additional guest features from The Kid Laroi and Latto.

Discography

Studio albums

Singles

As lead artist

As featured artist

Other charted songs

Guest appearances

Notes

References

External links 
 
 

21st-century American male musicians
21st-century American rappers
African-American male rappers
African-American songwriters
American male rappers
American male songwriters
RCA Records artists
Gangsta rappers
Living people
2001 births
Musicians from Jacksonville, Florida
Southern hip hop musicians
Trap musicians
21st-century African-American musicians
Rappers from Florida